CofE-AF may refer to:

 Coenzyme F420-0:L-glutamate ligase, an enzyme
 Coenzyme F420-1:gamma-L-glutamate ligase, an enzyme